On Heroes, Hero-Worship, & the Heroic in History is a book by the Scottish essayist, historian and philosopher Thomas Carlyle, published by James Fraser, London, in 1841. It is a collection of six lectures given in May 1840 about prominent historical figures. It lays out Carlyle's belief in the importance of heroic leadership.

Background
The book was based on a course of lectures Carlyle had given. The French Revolution: A History had brought Carlyle recognition, but little money, so friends organized courses of public lectures, drumming up an audience and selling one guinea tickets. Though Carlyle disliked lecturing, he discovered a facility for it; more importantly, it brought in much-needed income. Between 1837 and 1840, Carlyle delivered four such courses of lectures, the final of which was on "Heroes". His lecture notes were transformed into the book, with the effects of the spoken discourse still discernible in the prose."The Hero as Man of Letters" (1840):
 "In books lies the soul of the whole Past Time; the articulate audible voice of the Past, when the body and material substance of it has altogether vanished like a dream."
 "A man lives by believing something; not by debating and arguing about many things."
 "All that mankind has done, thought, gained or been: it is lying as in magic preservation in the pages of books."
 "What we become depends on what we read after all of the professors have finished with us. The greatest university of all is a collection of books."
 "The suffering man ought really to consume his own smoke; there is no good in emitting smoke till you have made it into fire."
 "Adversity is sometimes hard upon a man; but for one man who can stand prosperity, there are a hundred that will stand adversity." (Often shortened to "can't stand prosperity" as an unknown quote.)
 "Not what I have, but what I do, is my kingdom."

Lectures
 1. (5 May) The Hero as Divinity. Odin. Paganism: Scandinavian Mythology
 2. (8 May) The Hero as Prophet. Mahomet: Islam 
 3. (12 May) The Hero as Poet. Dante; Shakspeare
 4. (15 May) The Hero as Priest. Luther; Reformation: Knox; Puritanism
 5. (19 May) The Hero as Man of Letters. Johnson, Rousseau, Burns
 6. (22 May) The Hero as King. Cromwell. Napoleon: Modern Revolutionism

Summary
Carlyle was one of the few philosophers who lived through the British industrial revolution but maintained a non-materialistic view of historical development. The book included lectures discussing people ranging from the field of religion through to literature and politics. The figures chosen for each lecture were presented by Carlyle as archetypal examples of individuals who, in their respective fields of endeavour, had dramatically impacted history in some way. The Islamic prophet Muhammad found a place in the book in the lecture titled "The Hero as Prophet". In his work, Carlyle outlined Muhammad as a Hegelian agent of reform, insisting on his sincerity and commenting "how one man single-handedly, could weld warring tribes and wandering Bedouins into a most powerful and civilized nation in less than two decades". His interpretation has been widely cited by Muslim scholars to show Muhammad without orientalist bias.

Carlyle held that "Great Men should rule and that others should revere them," a view that for him was supported by a complex faith in history and evolutionary progress. Societies, like organisms, evolve throughout history, thrive for a time, but inevitably become weak and die out, giving place to a stronger, superior breed. Heroes are those who affirm this life process, accepting its cruelty as necessary and thus good. For them courage is a more valuable virtue than love; heroes are noblemen, not saints. The hero functions first as a pattern for others to imitate, and second as a creator, moving history forwards not backward (history being the biography of great men). Carlyle was among the first of his age to recognize that the death of God is in itself nothing to be happy about, unless man steps in and creates new values to replace the old. For Carlyle, the hero should become the object of worship, the centre of a new religion proclaiming humanity as "the miracle of miracles... the only divinity we can know". For Carlyle's creed Bentley proposes the name "heroic vitalism", a term embracing both a political theory, aristocratic radicalism, and a metaphysic, supernatural naturalism. The heroic vitalists feared that the recent trends toward democracy would hand over power to the ill-bred, uneducated, and immoral, whereas their belief in a transcendent force in nature directing itself onward and upward gave some hope that this overarching force would overrule in favor of the strong, intelligent, and noble.

For Carlyle, the hero was somewhat similar to Aristotle's "magnanimous" man – a person who flourished in the fullest sense. However, for Carlyle, unlike Aristotle, the world was filled with contradictions with which the hero had to deal. All heroes will be flawed. Their heroism lay in their creative energy in the face of these difficulties, not in their moral perfection. To sneer at such a person for their failings is the philosophy of those who seek comfort in the conventional. Carlyle called this "valetism", from the expression "no man is a hero to his valet".

Reception and legacy 
University of British Columbia professor Michael K. Goldberg writes:The gospel of heroes met resistance from nineteenth-century liberalism for ignoring the masses; from Engels, at least, among nineteenth-century Marxists for being too religious and mystical; from some segments of the established church for being too radical; and later from some twentieth-century democrats for being too tyrannical.Two reviews which appeared in the Christian Remembrancer in 1843 provide representative reactions to On Heroes. Archbishop of York William Thomson denounced Carlyle's syncretism, writing: "It is not a Christian Book." In response, theologian Frederick Denison Maurice defended Carlyle's emphasis on truth over semblances, as well as his ability to challenge and test the sincerity of readers that disagree with him.

Whether positively or negatively, the impact of the book was felt by all. Richard Garnett wrote that it was "echoed by all the best minds of [the] day". Vincent van Gogh wrote to his brother Theo in 1883 that it was "a very beautiful little book."

These lectures of Carlyle's are regarded as an early and powerful formulation of the Great Man theory of historical development.

Elizabeth Barrett Browning referenced the work in the 5th book of Aurora Leigh (1856). George Bernard Shaw took inspiration from On Heroes in his plays Arms and the Man (1894), The Man of Destiny (1897), Man and Superman (1905), and Back to Methuselah (1920).

Mahatma Gandhi read "The Hero as Prophet" in his studies of Islam and "learnt of the Prophet's greatness and bravery and austere living."

See also
Heroes in historical studies
Representative Men – a similar series of lectures, given by Carlyle's American contemporary Ralph Waldo Emerson
Parallel Lives – classic work by Ancient Greek biographer Plutarch, outlining the lives of elite individuals and the virtues they represented.

Bibliography

References

External links

online facsimile at google books
online edition Project Gutenberg

1841 non-fiction books
Works by Thomas Carlyle